Nephropides caribaeus is a species of lobster, the only species in the genus Nephropides. It is found in western parts of the Caribbean Sea, from Belize to Colombia.

Description
Nephropides caribaeus is a narrow lobster, resembling Nephropsis or Nephrops. It differs from Nephropsis in that the eyes contain pigment, which is lacking in Nephropsis. The rostrum has 2–3 lateral spines, but no spines on the lower edge. The whole body is covered in large tubercles, including the first pereiopods with their large chelae, and the other, smaller pereiopods.

Distribution and ecology
Nephropides caribaeus is found in the western Caribbean Sea, and has been recorded from Belize to Colombia.

Taxonomic history
The genus Nephropides and the species N. caribaeus were both erected in 1969 by Raymond B. Manning. A second species later described in the genus has since been transferred to Thymops as Thymops birsteini. The Food and Agriculture Organization has assigned the species an English name of "mitten lobsterette". The generic name Nephropides alludes to a close relationship with the genus Nephrops, while the specific epithet  is a reference to the Caribbean Sea.

References

True lobsters
Monotypic crustacean genera
Crustaceans of the Atlantic Ocean
Taxa named by Raymond B. Manning